Constellations is the fourth album by trumpeter Dave Douglas and the second to feature his Tiny Bell Trio.  It was released on the Swiss Hat Hut label in 1995 and features performances by Douglas, Brad Schoeppach and Jim Black.

Reception
The Allmusic review by Alex Henderson states "Constellations isn't easy to absorb on the first listen; like a lot of avant-garde jazz, this is music that reveals more and more of its power with each listen".

Track listing 
All compositions by Dave Douglas except as indicated

 "Constellations" - 7:07  
 "Unhooking the Safety Net" - 6:32  
 "Hope Ring True" - 9:09  
 "Taking Sides" - 6:10  
 "The Gig" (Herbie Nichols) - 5:29  
 "Scriabin" - 5:58  
 "Les Croquants" (Georges Brassens) - 2:47  
 "Maquiladora" - 11:08  
 "Vanitatus Vanitatum [Mit Humor]" (Robert Schumann) - 4:35
 Recorded in Zurich, Switzerland on February 27–28, 1995

Personnel 
 Dave Douglas – trumpet, producer
 Brad Schoeppach: guitar
 Jim Black – drums
 Bill Emmons – assistant engineer
 Isabelle Meister – photography
 Tony Reif – executive producer
 Jon Rosenberg – engineer
 David Thorne – design

References 

1995 albums
Dave Douglas (trumpeter) albums
Hathut Records albums